This is a list of German television related events from 1999.

Events
12 March - Corinna May is selected to represent Germany at the 1999 Eurovision Song Contest with her song "Hör den Kindern einfach zu". She is selected to be the forty-fourth German Eurovision entry during Countdown Grand Prix held at the Stadthalle in Bremen.
16 March - Corinna May was disqualified from the 1999 Eurovision Song Contest when it was discovered that the winning song "Hor den Kindern einfach zu" was released in 1997 by another act, since entering a cover song was contrary to the rules. Sürpriz, who were the runners-up performing "Reise nach Jerusalem – Kudüs'e seyahat" were therefore promoted and announced as the forty-fourth German Eurovision entry.

Debuts

Domestic
23 April -  (1999) (ProSieben)
3 September - Wer wird Millionär? (1999–present) (RTL)
12 October - Klemperer – Ein Leben in Deutschland (1999) (Das Erste)
1 November - Simsala Grimm (1999–2010) (KiKa)

International
4 January -  Skippy: Adventures in Bushtown (1998–1999) (Super RTL)
29 March -  Teletubbies (1997–2001, 2015–present) (KiKa)
18 September - / Ned's Newt (1997–1999) (Super RTL)
21 September -  Bimble's Bucket (1996–1998) (Junior)
2 October -  Flipper and Lopaka (1999–2005) (KiKa)
23 October -  Bob the Builder (1999–2012, 2015–present) (Super RTL)
 Bruno the Kid (1996–1997) (K-Toon)

BFBS
22 April -  Home Farm Twins (1999-2000)
8 May -  Bob the Builder (1999-2012, 2015-present)
26 May -  Pump It Up (1999-2000)
27 May -  Polterguests (1999)
28 May -  Butterfly Collectors (1999)
30 May -  Dream Street (1999-2002)
15 June - // Anthony Ant (1999)
4 July -  Misery Guts (1998-1999)
11 October -  Tweenies (1999-2002)
16 October -  Barmy Aunt Boomerang (1999-2000)
26 October -  Angelmouse (1999-2000)
 Maisy (1999-2000)
/ Starhill Ponies (1998-2002)
 Mopatop's Shop (1999-2003)

Changes of network affiliation

Military broadcasting

Television shows

1950s
Tagesschau (1952–present)

1960s
 heute (1963-present)

1970s
 heute-journal (1978-present)
 Tagesthemen (1978-present)

1980s
Wetten, dass..? (1981-2014)
Lindenstraße (1985–present)

1990s
Gute Zeiten, schlechte Zeiten (1992–present)
Marienhof (1992–2011)
Unter uns (1994-present)
Verbotene Liebe (1995-2015)
Schloss Einstein (1998–present)
In aller Freundschaft (1998–present)
Wer wird Millionär? (1999-present)

Ending this year

Births

Deaths

See also 
1999 in Germany